Here is the list of Norwegian sports federations :

Bridge : Norwegian Bridge Federation (Norsk Bridgeforbund)
Scrabble : Norwegian Scrabble Federation (Norsk Scrabbleforbund)
Chess : Norwegian Chess Federation (Norges Sjakkforbund)
Judo : Norwegian Judo Federation (Norges Judoforbund)
Golf : Norwegian Golf Federation (Norges Golfforbund) 
Swimming : Norwegian Swimming Federation (Norges Svømmeforbund)
Handball : Norwegian Handball Federation (Norges Handballforbund)
Football : Norwegian Football Federation (Norges Fotballforbund)
Boxing : Norwegian Boxing Federation(Norges Bokseforbund)
Bowling : Norwegian Bowling Federation (Norges Bowlingforbund)
Table tennis : Norwegian Table Tennis Federation (Norges Bordtennisforbund)

Others  
Norwegian Mind Sports Federation (Norsk Tankesportforbund)

Sports governing bodies in Norway
Sport governing bodies
governing bodies